The Dubai Miracle Garden (in Arabic: حديقة الزهور بدبي) is a flower garden located in the district of Dubailand, Dubai, United Arab Emirates. The garden was launched on Valentine's Day in 2013.

In April 2015, the garden was given the Moselle Award for New Garden Experiences of the year by the Garden Tourism Award 2015.

Development
The concept of the first miracle garden project was formed under an agreement between Dubailand and the Dubai Properties Group destination. The project development was done under an agreement with Akar Landscaping and Agriculture Company, led by Jordanian businessman Abdel Naser Rahhal. The cost of the project was estimated at AED 40 million (US$11 million).

Phase one of the project was completed and opened in February 2013 which consisted of  outdoor facility including vertical and horizontal landscaping design where each of them have their own design. The development of phase one took two months and required 400 workers.

Operations
The Dubai Miracle Garden generally operates from October to April every year.

Maintenance
According to the officials of Dubai Miracle Garden, the Dubai municipality retreats the grey water of the city and sends it directly to the garden. The garden again re-filters the water and converts it to high-quality water for its usage in the garden. The garden is only watered after it closes at night.

Dubai Butterfly Garden
In 2015 Dubai Miracle Garden opened the Dubai Butterfly Garden, the world's largest and the region's first indoor butterfly garden and sanctuary for over 15,000 butterflies from 26 species.

Agreement with Disney
As part of a licensing deal between the Dubai Miracle Garden and The Walt Disney Company, a topiary of Mickey Mouse was unveiled in February 2018. Flower structures of Minnie Mouse, Goofy, Pluto, Daisy Duck, Donald Duck, and Huey, Dewey, and Louie were installed later that year.

Guinness World Records 
The Dubai Miracle garden has achieved three Guinness World Records. In 2013, it was declared as the world's largest vertical garden. Currently an Airbus A380 flower structure in the garden is listed by Guinness World Records as the biggest flower structure in the world. The  topiary of Mickey Mouse, which weighs almost 35 tonnes, is the tallest topiary supported sculpture in the world.

See also
 Dubai Butterfly Garden

References

External links

 
 Dubai Miracle Garden blog
 Dubai Miracle Garden pictures
 Dubai Miracle Garden: A Heavenly Feeling

2013 establishments in the United Arab Emirates
Parks in Dubai
Gardens in the United Arab Emirates
Dubailand